Thomas Chaffyn (by 1498–1558), was an English politician.

He was a Member (MP) of the Parliament of England for Salisbury in 1529.

His son, Thomas Chaffyn, was also an MP for Salisbury and Heytesbury.

References

15th-century births
1558 deaths
English MPs 1529–1536